Bert Schroer (born 10 November 1933 in Gelsenkirchen, Germany) is a German mathematical physicist, now a  visiting professor in Rio de Janeiro and an emeritus professor in Berlin, who is known for his work on algebraic quantum field theory, braid groups, infraparticles, and other issues related to quantum field theory.

He studied physics at the University of Hamburg from 1953 to 1958 and received his PhD there in 1963 on the topic of "Theory of Infraparticles". From 1959 to 1961 he was a research associate at the University of Illinois and 1963-74 at the Institute for Advances Studies, Princeton. He was then Associate Professor at the University of Pittsburgh (1964-1970) and Full Professor at the Free University of Berlin (1970-1999). He held visiting positions at USP, São Paulo, Brazil (1971/72), at CERN, Geneva, Switzerland (1976/77), and at the Pontifical Catholic University (PUC) in Rio de Janeiro, Brazil (1979/80). Furthermore, he was a visiting professor at CERN (1985/1986) and at the Math. Dept. of UC Berkeley (1992). Since 1999 he is emeritus professor at the Institute for Theoretical Physics at the Freie Universität Berlin and Visiting Professor at the Centro Brasileiro de Pesquisas Físicas (CBPF), Rio de Janeiro, Brazil.

External links
 Free University Berlin's Bio sketch of Dr. Schroer

1933 births
Living people
20th-century German physicists
People from Gelsenkirchen
Academic staff of the Free University of Berlin